The 2021 U Sports football season began on August 28, 2021 with the Sherbrooke Vert et Or hosting the Montreal Carabins in Sherbrooke, Quebec. The Atlantic University Sport conference began play on September 17, 2021 and ten Ontario University Athletics teams opened their seasons on September 18, 2021. The Canada West conference began their regular season last with all six teams playing on September 25, 2021. Due to the COVID-19 pandemic in Canada, all conferences except the RSEQ played six regular season games while the RSEQ played eight.

The conference championships were played on the weekend of November 20 and the season concluded on December 4 with the 56th Vanier Cup championship, with the Western Mustangs defeating the Saskatchewan Huskies by a score of 27–21. 27 university teams in Canada played U Sports football this season, the highest level of amateur Canadian football.

Schedule changes
The Atlantic University Sport conference was the first to announce their 2021 schedule after no conference played in 2020 due to the COVID-19 pandemic in Canada. The AUS confirmed a schedule of six regular season games instead of the usual eight with a start date three weeks later than the 2019 scheduled start with the additional one-week delay of this year's Vanier Cup game. The AUS also had four out of five teams qualify for playoffs, instead of three, with the fourth seeded team playing the top team and the second seed playing the third. The Loney Bowl was played on November 20, 2021.

The Canada West conference announced their schedule shortly after the AUS, on June 21, 2021, with all six teams playing on September 25, 2021. Canada West featured six teams playing six regular season games apiece with each team playing one game against the other plus one additional game. The first week's opponents are the same as the last week's opponents with the host switching for the last week. The 84th Hardy Cup game was played on the weekend of November 20, 2021.

On June 30, 2021, both the OUA and RSEQ released their schedules. The OUA also played on a reduced schedule with each team playing six regular season games over a seven-week regular season. Notably, some OUA teams' schedules featured repeat matchups with some teams playing opponents twice in order to reduce travel. The OUA also shifted to a two-division set up with Carleton, Ottawa, Queen's, Toronto, and York in the East Division and Guelph, McMaster, Waterloo, Western, Wilfrid Laurier, and Windsor in the West Division. The 113th Yates Cup games was played on November 20, 2021. The RSEQ is scheduled to play a standard eight-game schedule with five teams playing over the course of a ten-week regular season. Notably, the Dunsmore Cup did not endure the same delay as the other conference championships and was played on November 13, 2021.

Regular season

Standings

Post-season awards

Award-winners

All-Canadian Team

Post-season 
The Vanier Cup is played between the champions of the Mitchell Bowl and the Uteck Bowl, the national semi-final games. In 2021, according to the rotating schedule, the Atlantic conference's Loney Bowl championship team will visit the Yates Cup Ontario championship team for the Mitchell Bowl. The winners of the Canada West Hardy Trophy will visit the Québec conference Dunsmore Cup championship team for the Uteck Bowl. These games are scheduled to be played on November 27, 2021. On June 17, 2021, it was announced that the 56th Vanier Cup would be played in Quebec City, Quebec and would be hosted by Université Laval for the seventh time in school history.

Atlantic University Sport

Réseau du sport étudiant du Québec

Ontario University Athletics

Canada West Universities Athletic Association

National Semifinals

National Championship

References

External links
 Official website

2021 in Canadian football
U Sports football seasons